The 1797 United States Senate election in Pennsylvania was held on February 16, 1797. Incumbent James Ross was re-elected by the Pennsylvania General Assembly to the United States Senate.

Background
After Sen. Albert Gallatin was removed from office after his eligibility was successfully challenged, James Ross was elected by the General Assembly, consisting of the Pennsylvania House of Representatives and Pennsylvania State Senate, in 1794 to fill the remainder of the unexpired term, which was to expire on March 4, 1797.

Results
The Pennsylvania General Assembly convened on February 16, 1797, to elect a Senator to fill the term beginning on March 4, 1797. The results of the vote of both houses combined are as follows:

References

External links
Pennsylvania Election Statistics: 1682-2006 from the Wilkes University Election Statistics Project

1797
Pennsylvania
United States Senate